The term College entrance exam may refer to any standardized test which is needed in order for one to be considered eligible for application by a post-secondary institution.  Such examinations may include

SAT Reasoning Test, in the United States 
ACT, also in the United States
The Hong Kong Diploma of Secondary Education, in Hong Kong
Leaving Certificate, the university matriculation examination in Ireland.
Baccalauréat, the academic qualification examination in France
ATAR, the academic qualification examination in Australia
Abitur, the academic qualification examination in Germany
GCSE, in England, Wales and Northern Ireland
IGCSE, administered by Cambridge International Examinations
OSS (Student Selection and Placement System), the academic qualification and ranking exam in Turkey, where more than 1.7 million students take each year
Matura, the academic qualification examination in Albania, Austria, Bosnia and Herzegovina, Bulgaria, Croatia, the Czech Republic, Hungary, Italy, Liechtenstein, Lithuania, Macedonia, Montenegro, Poland, Serbia, Slovakia, Slovenia and Switzerland
TS ĐH-CĐ, in Vietnam
Selectividad, in Spain
University Entrance Exam commonly known as Konkour, in Iran
CSAT(수능), in South Korea.
Gaokao National College Entrance Examination, in China.
National Center Test for University Admissions, in Japan
SBMPTN, a competitive exam required to enroll in public universities in Indonesia.
PSU Prueba de Selección Universitaria, in Chile
ENEM Exame Nacional do Ensino Médio, in Brazil
ICFES Examen ICFES Prueba Saber 11, in Colombia
 Riigieksamid — in Estonia.
 Unified State Exam – in Russia.
 External independent testing - in Ukraine.
 Unified National Testing - in Kazakhstan.
 General Republican Testing - in Kyrgyzstan.
 Centralized Testing - in Belarus, Latvia and Tajikistan
 Unified State/National Exams - in Armenia and Georgia 
 Bacalaureat - in Moldova and Romania
 General Scholastic Ability Test - in Taiwan

Notes

See also
 Matriculation exam

School examinations